Events from the year 1898 in China (戊戌).

Incumbents
Guangxu Emperor (24th year)

Events
March 9 Kiautschou Bay concession leasing Qingdao to German Empire "on 6 March 1898 the German Empire retreated from outright cession of the area and accepted a leasehold of the bay for 99 years, or until 1997"
March 27 Convention for the Lease of the Liaotung Peninsula or Pavlov Agreement for Russian Dalian 
May 29 Lease of Guangzhouwan to France
June 9 - Convention between England and China Respecting an Extension of Hong Kong Territory, the New Territories leased to England for 99 years
June 11-September 21 - Hundred Days' Reform
 June 11, Emperor Guangxu promulgated the decree of Clear Instructions for Important Affairs of State
July 1 Lease of Weihaiwei under British rule
Imperial University of Peking (now Peking University) founded

Births
March 5 - Zhou Enlai
May - Wang Zuo
June - Zhang Tailei
October - Yuan Wencai
October 24 - Peng Dehuai
November 24 - Liu Shaoqi
Tong Linge

Deaths
September 28 - Tan Sitong, Lin Xu, Kang Guangren (brother of Kang Youwei), Yang Shenxiu, Yang Rui (reformer) and Liu Guangdi

References

 
1890s in China
Years of the 19th century in China